Eivind Nævdal-Bolstad (born 23 April 1987) is a Norwegian politician for the Conservative Party.

He served as a deputy representative to the Parliament of Norway from Hordaland during the term 2009–2013. As deputy of Henning Warloe he met in parliamentary session often.

He hails from Odda, but moved to study at Volda University College in 2010 and was elected to Volda municipal council in 2011.

References

1987 births
Living people
People from Odda
Deputy members of the Storting
Conservative Party (Norway) politicians
Hordaland politicians
Møre og Romsdal politicians
21st-century Norwegian politicians